Locust Fork may refer to:
Locust Fork, Alabama
Locust Fork of the Black Warrior River
Locust Fork (band)